Javersiyan (also Romanized as Jāversīyān, Jāvarsīān, Jāverseyān, Jāversīān, and Jāwar Siān) is a city in Javersiyan Rural District, Qareh Chay District, Khondab County, Markazi Province, Iran. At the 2006 census, its population was 4,573, in 1,275 families.

References 

Populated places in Khondab County
Cities in Markazi Province